Coscinida triangulifera, is a species of spider of the genus Coscinida. It is found only in Sri Lanka and Java.

See also
 List of Theridiidae species

References

Theridiidae
Endemic fauna of Sri Lanka
Spiders of Asia
Spiders described in 1904